The Sydney University Rugby League Football Club is a rugby league team currently playing in the Saturday Metro League competition. The University of Sydney was represented in the New South Wales Rugby Football League premiership from 1920 to 1937 as University, and also in the NSWRL Second Division and Metropolitan League competitions from 1963 to 1976.

History
The movement at the University of Sydney to be involved in the new game of rugby league began in 1919 with a number of players (including seven University Blues from the 1918 season) viewing a game of the new code and deciding to switch codes.  As put by Herbert Vere Evatt (a final year law student and later a politician, jurist and president of the UN General Assembly) at the time the reasons were:

"Owing to the general dissatisfaction with the management of the Rugby Union during the 1919 football season, and the fact that University footballers were starting to realise that rugby league was a faster and cleaner game, several leading members of the football club, including seven 'blues' of the past season, took steps to introduce the league game into the University for the 1920 season. A special meeting of league supporters was held and decided to enter three teams, all members to play as strict amateurs."

Anti-rugby league prejudice
From the very beginning, the Students (or 'Varsity' as they were also known) struggled to gain acceptance by the University Sports Association who displayed great prejudice toward those who had left the rugby union side to play rugby league.

Indeed, players who participated in rugby league matches were threatened with disqualification from ever playing rugby union at Oxford University or University of Cambridge and the Sports Association forbid the club from training on the University Oval (forcing Varsity to train with Eastern Suburbs at the Sydney Sports Ground). While public pressure forced the Association to relent, the club never once played a game at the University Oval during its involvement in the New South Wales Rugby League premiership.

1926 Grand Final
The highlight of the Students' 18 seasons in the NSWRL Premiership was their one and only finals appearance (having finished fourth in the regular season). To get to the Grand Final at the Sydney Agricultural Ground University had to defeat Glebe which they did comfortably 29 - 3. In the Grand Final, however, they were defeated 5–11 by Souths in front of 20,000 people.

Withdrawal from the Premiership
Generally, the amateur students struggled to perform against the professional players of the other sides and University enjoyed very little success only winning 44 of its 226 games during its time in the Premiership (and only won 2 games after 1933). The club did not win a single match in 1935, continuing a losing streak that started in round 2, 1934 and which would run till round 14, 1936 and which marked the most consecutive losses in NSWRL/NRL premiership history at 42. This run of form, in addition to having spent 12 of its 18 seasons in last place prompted their decision to withdraw from the Premiership at the close of the 1937 season.

Life After the Premiership
Rugby league did not perish at the University of Sydney and sides representing the university continued to play in various competitions. Most notably, Varsity played in the NSWRL Inter-District Competition, Second Division and Metropolitan League (predecessors to the Jim Beam Cup) between 1964 and 1976, finishing as Second Division runners-up in 1969 and 1971, both times to the leading side of the day Wentworthville.

Wills Cup
As runners-up in the 1969 Second Division, University (along with Wentworthville) were invited to compete in the NSWRL pre-season competition (the Wills Cup) in 1970.

Despite the inclusion of mature players from other metropolitan University clubs and professional coaches, the sides were too inexperienced and light to compete with the senior club sides.  University finished 13th (above last-placed Penrith) in the competition with 1 win from 4 games (their lone win, a close 19–17 victory, came against Wentworthville), with a points differential of -29.

University Shield Competition
In 1922 the University of Sydney Club presented the league with a shield for use as a trophy in a statewide High School Rugby League knockout competition. The competition became known as the 'University Shield' and is widely regarded as one of the most prestigious competitions in schoolboy rugby league.

The University Shield has undergone various changes in format since its inception in 1922, the most notable of these having been the exclusion of specialised 'Sports High Schools' which dominated the competition between 1996 and 2006 in a spirit deemed 'untrue' to the traditional concept of the competition.

Sydney Shield
In December 2018, it was revealed that University would be competing in the Sydney Shield competition.
At the end of the 2019 Sydney Shield season, University finished 10th on the table.  Due to the Covid-19 Pandemic, University were initially meant to compete in the 2021 Sydney Shield but pulled out for financial reasons.

University Shield Honour Board (1922-2007)

Players of Note
Australian Representative

 Ray Morris (1933/34 Kangaroo Tour)
 Jim Craig

New South Wales

 Hubert "Butt" Finn
 Jim McIntyre
 A.S. Lane
 Edmund "Feather" Hanrahan
 Harleigh Hanrahan
 Clive Evatt
 Tom Linskey
 Tom Barry
 Frank O'Rourke
 Ray Morris
 Ross McKinnon
 Simon Rollin
 Rod O'Loan

Records

Club Records
Biggest Win
34 points, 42–8 against St George Dragons at Sydney Sports Ground on 15 July 1933.

Biggest Loss
63 points, 0–63 against South Sydney Rabbitohs at Sydney Sports Ground on 17 April 1937.

Most Consecutive Wins
5 matches, 8 May – 19 June 1926

Most Consecutive Loses
42 matches^, 28 April 1934 – 29 August 1936

^ denotes premiership record

Club Honours
Premierships: (0)

Runners-Up: (1) 1926

Minor Premierships: (0)

Wooden Spoons: (10) 1921, 1923, 1927, 1929, 1930, 1931, 1934, 1935, 1936, 1937

References

External links

RL1908's University page

Rugby clubs established in 1920
1920 establishments in Australia
University and college rugby league clubs
Rugby league team
Rugby league teams in Sydney
University and college sports clubs in Australia